Zinc fingers and homeoboxes protein 2 is a protein that in humans is encoded by the ZHX2 gene.

The members of the zinc fingers and homeoboxes gene family are nuclear homodimeric transcriptional repressors that interact with the A subunit of nuclear factor-Y (NF-YA) and contain two C2H2-type zinc fingers and five homeobox DNA-binding domains. This gene encodes member 2 of this gene family. In addition to forming homodimers, this protein heterodimerizes with member 1 of the zinc fingers and homeoboxes family.

See also 
 Chromosome 8 (human)
 NFYA
 Protein dimer

References

Further reading